Marshall Lee Rogers (August 27, 1953 – June 15, 2011) was an American professional basketball player and former NCAA basketball scoring champion with Pan American University.

Basketball career

High school

Rogers attended Sumner High School in St. Louis, Missouri.  He was on the Bulldogs 1969 Missouri Class L state champion basketball team as a reserve.  In 1970 and 1971, Rogers led Sumner to consecutive Public High League titles.  In his senior year he averaged 26.4 points per game and was named to the all-state team.

In addition to basketball, Rogers was also an accomplished track athlete.  He was the 1971 Missouri state champion in the triple jump.

College
A 6'1" guard from Pan American University and the University of Kansas.  While at Kansas Rogers played in 18 games and averaged 7.6 ppg.  After not getting along with head coach Ted Owens, Rogers transferred to Pan American University, who had just hired Abe Lemons, where he sat out his sophomore season due to NCAA transfer rules.  In the 1974–75 season, Rogers averaged 26.7 points per game as he led the Broncs to a 22-2 record.  The following year, Rogers averaged 36.8 ppg and led the nation in scoring.

Professional
Rogers played one season (1976–1977) in the National Basketball Association as a member of the Golden State Warriors. He averaged 3.8 points in his 26-game NBA career.

Later life
After his basketball career ended, he worked as a substitute teacher in his hometown of St. Louis, Missouri. He then began a lawn care company. In his later years, he suffered from complications related to diabetes. He died at age 57 in June 2011.

References

1957 births
2011 deaths
American men's basketball players
Basketball players from St. Louis
Golden State Warriors draft picks
Golden State Warriors players
Guards (basketball)
Kansas Jayhawks men's basketball players
Texas–Pan American Broncs men's basketball players